The Snohomish River is a river in Snohomish County, Washington, formed by the confluence of the Skykomish and Snoqualmie rivers near Monroe. It flows northwest entering Port Gardner Bay, part of Puget Sound, between Everett and Marysville. The Pilchuck River is its main tributary and joins the river at Snohomish. The river system drains the west side of the Cascade Mountains from Snoqualmie Pass to north of Stevens Pass.

Course

The Snohomish River forms at the confluence of the Snoqualmie and Skykomish Rivers just west of Monroe. Both of these rivers originate in the Cascades and drain the west slopes of the mountains in southeastern Snohomish County and northeastern King County. The Snohomish River flows generally northwestward from the confluence, passing under state route 522 and flowing alongside Lord Hill Regional Park before reaching downtown Snohomish. Here, it is joined by the Pilchuck River, its main tributary, and flows under state route 9. From Snohomish, the river continues northwestward through a broad floodplain, forming the eastern boundary of the city of Everett. The final few miles of the river in Everett form the Snohomish River estuary, a river delta that features wetlands and tideflats spread out across various islands and arms of the river. Several bridges carry U.S. 2, Interstate 5, and state route 529 across the delta. The river then empties into Possession Sound, which is part of Puget Sound, between Everett and Marysville.

See also
List of rivers of Washington

References

External links

Snohomish River at Snohomish County website

Rivers of Snohomish County, Washington
Rivers of Washington (state)